The 1996 United States House of Representatives election in Montana was held on November 5, 1996 to determine who will represent the state of Montana in the United States House of Representatives. Montana has one, at large district in the House, apportioned according to the 1990 United States Census, due to its low population. Representatives are elected for two-year terms.

General Election

Results

References 

1996 Montana elections
Montana
1996